Otopleura auriscati, common name the cat's ear pyram, is a species of sea snail, a marine gastropod mollusk in the family Pyramidellidae, the pyrams and their allies.

Description
The length of the shell varies between 10 mm and 30 mm.

The smooth, white, solid shell has an ovate, elongated shape. The pointed spire is composed of ten or eleven slightly convex whorls, distinct and separated by a narrow scaffolding accompanying the suture, which is somewhat undulated. The body whorl is almost as large as all the others together. All whorls are longitudinally ribbed, extremely regular, often terminated at their summit by a small tubercle at the sutures. The shell has spiral rows of chestnut spots. The interstices of the ribs are spirally striated with fine transverse striae.

The coloring of this shell is whitish. The shell is ornamented with reddish spots arranged in transverse series, almost always united, and forming three bands upon the upper whorls, and five upon the body whorl. Upon this is often seen also, a large brown and irregular blotch. The aperture ovate, elongated, narrow, and slightly oblique. The outer lip is thick, white, forming a little gutter at the base. The columella is imperforate at its lower extremity, oblique, bearing three unequal folds. The first is more prominent, is horizontal, thin, and sharp; the two others are oblique and smaller.

Distribution
This species occurs in the following locations:
 Red Sea
 Madagascar, Mauritius
 Indonesia, the Philippines
 Australia (Northern Territory, Queensland, Western Australia)
 Japan

References

 Chemnitz, J.H. 1795. Neues systematisches Conchylien - Cabinet. Nürnberg : G.N. Raspe Vol. 11 312 + 124 pp., pls 174 -213. 
 Holten, H.S. 1802. Enumeratio Systematica Conchyliae Beat. J.H. Chemnitz. Copenhagen : K.H. Scidelini 88 pp.
 Lamarck, J.B.P.A. de M. 1816. Liste des objets représentés dans les planches de cette livraison. pp. 1-16 in Lamarck, J.B.P.A. de M. Tableau encyclopédique et méthodique des trois règnes de la nature. Vers, coquilles, mollusques et polypiers. Paris : Agasse Part 23 pp. 1–16, pls 391-488.
 Dillwyn, L.W. 1817. A Descriptive Catalogue of Recent Shells, arranged according to the Linnaean method; with particular attention to the synonymy. London : John and Arthur Arch 2 volumes 1092 + 29 pp.
 Adams, A. 1853. Family Pyramidellidae. pp. 228–235 in Adams, H. & Adams, A. The genera of Recent Mollusca arranged according to their organization. London : John Van Voorst Vol. 1(Parts I-VIII) pp. 1–256, pls 1-32.
 Tryon, G.W. 1886. Manual of Conchology, structural and systematic: with illustrations of the species. Series 2 Philadelphia : Published by the author Vol. 8 pp. 461, pls 79.
 Dautzenberg, Ph. (1929). Mollusques testacés marins de Madagascar. Faune des Colonies Francaises, Tome III
 Laseron, C. 1959. The family Pyramidellidae (Mollusca) from northern Australia. Australian Journal of Marine and Freshwater Research 10: 177-267, figs 1-213 
 Higo, S., Callomon, P. & Goto, Y. (1999) Catalogue and Bibliography of the Marine Shell-Bearing Mollusca of Japan. Elle Scientific Publications, Yao, Japan, 749 pp. page(s): 356

General references
 Adams, A. 1854. Monographs of the genera Eulima, Niso, Leiostraca, Obeliscus, Pyramidella and Monoptygma. pp. 793–825 in Sowerby, G.B. (ed.). Thesaurus Conchyliorum or monographs of genera of shells. London : Sowerby Vol. 2 pp. 439–899.
 Adams, A. 1854. Monographs of the genera Eulima, Niso, Leiostraca, Obeliscus, Pyramidella and Monoptygma. pp. 793–825 in Sowerby, G.B. (ed.). Thesaurus Conchyliorum or monographs of genera of shells. London : Sowerby Vol. 2 pp. 439–899.
 Reeve, L.A. 1865. Monograph of the genus Pyramidella. pls 1-6 in Reeve, L.A. (ed). Conchologia Iconica. London : L. Reeve & Co. Vol. 15.
 Tryon, G.W. 1886. Manual of Conchology, structural and systematic: with illustrations of the species. Series 2 Philadelphia : Published by the author Vol. 8 pp. 461, pls 79.
 Clessin, S 1902. Die Familie der Eulimidae. Systematisches Conchylien-Cabinet von Martini und Chemnitz 1(28): 1-273, pls 1-41
 Dall, W.H. & Bartsch, P. 1904. Synopsis of the genera, subgenera and sections of the family Pyramidellidae. Proceedings of the Biological Society of Washington 17: 1-16
 Schepman, M.M. 1909. The Prosobranchia of the Siboga Expedition. Part 3 Gymnoglossa. pp. 234–245 in Weber, M. (ed.). Siboga-Expedite. Leiden : Brill Vol. 48.
 Hedley, C. 1910. The marine fauna of Queensland. Australasian Association for the Advancement of Science 12: 329-371
 Allan, J.K. 1950. Australian Shells: with related animals living in the sea, in freshwater and on the land. Melbourne : Georgian House xix, 470 pp., 45 pls, 112 text figs.
 Laseron, C. 1959. The family Pyramidellidae (Mollusca) from northern Australia. Australian Journal of Marine and Freshwater Research 10: 177-267, figs 1-213 
 Saurin, E. 1959. Pyramidellidae de Nha-Trang (Viet-Nam). Annales de la Faculté des Sciences, Saigon (1959): 223-283, pls 1-9 
 Rippingale, O.H. & McMichael, D.F. 1961. Queensland and Great Barrier Reef Shells. Brisbane : Jacaranda Press 210 pp.
 Cernohorsky, W.O. 1972. Marine Shells of the Pacific. Sydney : Pacific Publications Vol. 2 411 pp., 68 pls.
 Tantanasiriwong, R. 1978. An illustrated checklist of marine shelled gastropods from Phuket Island, adjacent mainland and offshore islands, Western Peninsula, Thailand. Phuket Marine Biological Center, Research Bulletin 21: 1-22, 259 figs
 Coleman, N. 1981. What shell is that? Sydney : Lansdowne Press, Sydney 308 pp.
 Springsteen, F.J. & Leobrera, F.M. 1986. Shells of the Philippines. Manila : Carfel Seashell Museum 377 pp., 100 pls.
 Short, J.W. & Potter, D.G. 1987. Shells of Queensland and The Great Barrier Reef. Drummoyne, NSW : Golden press Pty Ltd 135 pp., 60 pl.
 Wells, F.F., Bryce, C.W., Clark, J.E. & Hansen, G.M. 1990. Christmas Shells. The marine molluscs of Christmas Island (Indian Ocean). Christmas Island: Australia : Christmas Island Natural History Association 98 pp., pls 1-81.
 Okutani, T. 2000. Marine mollusks in Japan. Tokai University Press 1173 pp.
 Willan, R.C. 2005. The molluscan fauna from the emergent reefs of the northernmost Sahul Shelf, Timor Sea — Ashmore, Cartier and Hibernia Reefs; biodiversity and zoogeography. pp. 51–81 in Russell, B.C. et al. (eds). Understanding the Cultural and Natural Heritage values and Management Challenges of the Ashmore Region. The Beagle, Records of the Museums and Art Galleries of the Northern Territory Suppl. 1: 248 pp.
 To Biodiversity Heritage Library (1 publication)
 To Encyclopedia of Life
 To World Register of Marine Species
 

Pyramidellidae
Gastropods described in 1802